is a former Japanese football player.

Playing career
Takahiro Ohara played for Tokushima Vortis, Grulla Morioka and Fukushima United FC from 2009 to 2015.

References

External links

1986 births
Living people
Tokai University alumni
Association football people from Fukushima Prefecture
Japanese footballers
J2 League players
J3 League players
Japan Football League players
Tokushima Vortis players
Iwate Grulla Morioka players
Fukushima United FC players
Association football defenders